Lamar Mady (born December 13, 1990) is an American football center for the Arizona Rattlers of the Indoor Football League (IFL). He was signed by the Oakland Raiders as an undrafted free agent in 2013. He played college football for Youngstown State.

Professional career

Oakland Raiders

On September 2, 2013, before the beginning of the National Football League 2013 regular season, the Oakland Raiders sign undrafted free agent guard Lamar Mady to their practice squad.

On September 23, 2013 the Oakland Raiders activate Lamar Mady from the practice squad to their active roster due to injuries on the Raiders offensive line.

On September 1, 2015, Mady was waived by the Raiders.

Hudson Valley Fort
During the Fall of 2015, Mady played for the Hudson Valley Fort of the Fall Experimental Football League.

Arizona Rattlers
On November 5, 2015, Mady was assigned to the Arizona Rattlers of the Arena Football League. On November 16, 2016, Mady re-signed with the Rattlers as they transition into the Indoor Football League. Mady was named First-team All-Indoor Football League as a center following the 2017 season. On July 8, the Rattlers defeated the Sioux Falls Storm in the United Bowl by a score of 50–41. He re-signed with the Rattlers on August 28, 2017.

References

External links
Oakland Raiders bio
Youngstown State Penguins bio

American football offensive guards
Youngstown State Penguins football players
Oakland Raiders players
Sportspeople from Topeka, Kansas
Players of American football from Kansas
1990 births
Living people
Hudson Valley Fort players
Arizona Rattlers players